Masahiko Sawaguchi (澤口 雅彦, born July 22, 1985) is a Japanese football player who plays for Ococias Kyoto AC.

Career
On 8 February 2019, Sawaguchi joined Ococias Kyoto AC.

Club statistics
Updated to 23 February 2018.

References

External links

1985 births
Living people
Ryutsu Keizai University alumni
Association football people from Ibaraki Prefecture
Japanese footballers
J2 League players
Japan Football League players
FC Ryukyu players
Fagiano Okayama players
Ococias Kyoto AC players
Association football midfielders